Liberation at Riverton is a 1982 role-playing game adventure published by Timeline for The Morrow Project.

Contents
Liberation at Riverton is the first released scenario for The Morrow Project, and is designed for use by beginning players.

Reception
William A. Barton reviewed Liberation at Riverton in The Space Gamer No. 56. Barton commented that "Liberation at Riverton is a worthy effort and is, one hopes, only the first in a strong of scenarios for use with TMP to alleviate the problems of those of us who don't have the time to create our own."

Chris Baylis reviewed Liberation at Riverton for Imagine magazine, and stated that "There is not an abundance of information concerning this scenario; that which is available to the players is given to them in an unconvincing way."

Phil Masters reviewed Liberation at Riverton for White Dwarf #42, giving it an overall rating of 6 out of 10, and stated that "the players need luck, judgement, and decisiveness, and if they fail, the party will probably get wiped out. How you feel about this is a matter of taste ..."

Reviews
Different Worlds #46

References

Role-playing game supplements introduced in 1982
The Morrow Project adventures